Described as the largest sand sculpture event in the world, the International Sand Sculpture Festival or Festival Internacional de Escultura em Areia (FIESA) has been held in Pêra, Algarve, Portugal annually since 2003. The site at  occupies .  Each year about 60 artists use 35000 tons of sand to create 50 works of art. The exhibition is also open in the evenings with atmospheric lighting.

Themes 

Each year the exhibition has a different theme:

2014: Music II
2013: Music
2012: Idols
2011: Animal Kingdom
2010: Living World
2009: Discoveries
2008: Hollywood Films and Characters
2007: Wonders of the World
2006: Mythology
2005: Lost Worlds
2004: Tales of Enchantment

See also 
 Sand festival

References

External links 

Art festivals in Portugal
Sand art
Outdoor sculptures in Portugal
Tourist attractions in the Algarve
Annual events in Portugal
Recurring events established in 2003
2003 establishments in Portugal